Täby was previously a trimunicipal locality, with 66,292 inhabitants in 2013. However, as from 2016, Statistics Sweden has amalgamated this locality with the Stockholm urban area. It is the seat of Täby Municipality in Stockholm County, Sweden. It was also partly located in Danderyd Municipality (the Enebyberg area) and a very small part in Sollentuna Municipality.

Täby kyrkby in the northern part of Täby Municipality forms on the other hand part of the Vallentuna urban area.

References 

Municipal seats of Stockholm County
Swedish municipal seats
Populated places in Danderyd Municipality
Populated places in Sollentuna Municipality
Populated places in Täby Municipality
Uppland